Crow Point may refer to
 Crow Point in England, at the southern end of Braunton Burrows, on the Taw-Torridge Estuary in North Devon
 Crow Point in America, at the entrance to Hingham Harbor, Massachusetts

 PointCrow, an American internet personality born in 1998